Chen Xiujun (b. 20 January 1986) is a former Olympic-level backstroke swimmer from China. She swam for the China team at the 2004 Olympics, where the team placed 4th in the 4x 100 metres Medley Relay. Chen Xiujun also swam in the 2004 Summer Olympics see below for tables of best and previous times.

*Age of Athlete when personal best was set

*Age of Athlete at event

References

1986 births
Living people
Swimmers from Guangdong
Chinese female backstroke swimmers
Olympic swimmers of China
Swimmers at the 2004 Summer Olympics
People from Huizhou
Swimmers at the 2002 Asian Games
Asian Games competitors for China
21st-century Chinese women